AwesomeAKO, editor

Juxtarctia multiguttata is a polymorphic tiger-moth in the subfamily Arctiinae, endemic for Himalayas. It is known from India: north-west Himalayas, Sikkim, Assam; Nepal; Bhutan; Myanmar; China: Tibet within western slopes of the Himalayas; Indochina (from Thailand to Vietnam and Cambodia).

References

 , 2010: Tiger-moths of Eurasia (Lepidoptera, Arctiidae) (Nyctemerini by ). Neue Entomologische Nachrichten 65: 1–106, Marktleuthen.
 , 2005: The multiguttata complex of the genus Spilarctia Butler (Arctiinae: Arctiidae: Lepidoptera) from India. Entomon 30 (3): 207–220, University of Kerala: Kariavattom, Trivandrum, India.
 , 2002: A new genus and two new species of Arctiinae, Arctiidae: Lepidoptera, from India. Journal of the Bombay Natural History Society 99 (1): 79–85, Mumbai.

Written and edited by Wikipedia family

Spilosomina
Moths of Asia
Fauna of the Himalayas
Insects of Southeast Asia
Moths described in 1855
Taxa named by Francis Walker (entomologist)